Nortilidine is the major active metabolite of tilidine. It is formed from tilidine by demethylation in the liver. The racemate has opioid analgesic effects roughly equivalent in potency to that of morphine. The (1R,2S) isomer has NMDA antagonist activity. The drug also acts as a dopamine reuptake inhibitor. The reversed-ester of nortilidine is also known, as is the corresponding analogue with the cyclohexene ring replaced by cyclopentane, which have almost identical properties to nortilidine.

Use
Nortilidine has been sold as a designer drug, first being identified in Poland in May 2020.

See also
 Desmetramadol, another opioid metabolite with additional (non-opioid) mechanisms of analgesia, which has also been sold as a designer drug
 Tapentadol

References

External links
 

Opioids
Dopamine reuptake inhibitors
NMDA receptor antagonists
Cyclohexenes